Barbara Gaskin (born 5 June 1950) is a British singer formerly associated with the UK Canterbury scene.

Gaskin was lead vocalist in British folk-prog band Spirogyra (1969–1974). From 1973 to 1976, she sang backing vocals with Dave Stewart's band Hatfield and the North, as one-third of 'The Northettes' (with Ann Rosenthal and Amanda Parsons, both since retired from music).  In 1981, she and Stewart formed a duo, and later in October of that year, they had a number one single in the UK with a cover version of the song "It's My Party". Subsequent singles "Busy Doing Nothing" (1983), and "The Locomotion" (1986) also entered the UK Singles Chart, without reaching the heights of their debut release. Seven albums followed, released on the duo's own Broken Records label. Gaskin and Stewart continue to work together and occasionally play live concerts with Andy Reynolds (guitar, 1990–2009), Beren Matthews (guitar, 2018 onwards) and drummer Gavin Harrison (Tokyo 2001 and London 2018 concerts). Gaskin has also sung with Egg (The Civil Surface), National Health, Peter Blegvad (The Naked Shakespeare), Phil Miller, Nigel Planer (Neil's Heavy Concept Album), Jane Wiedlin (Tangled), Rick Biddulph and Mont Campbell (Music from a Round Tower).

History
Barbara Gaskin was born and grew up in Hatfield, Hertfordshire, England. She had formal training in piano and cello from the age of 10. In her early teens she taught herself very basic acoustic guitar (Lesson 1: The strings face outwards) and performed in local folk clubs.

In 1969 she moved from Hatfield to Canterbury to study for a degree in Philosophy and Literature at University of Kent at Canterbury, but immediately became involved in the Canterbury music scene, joining folk rock group Spirogyra as vocalist. Spirogyra quickly procured a recording contract and subsequently made 3 albums, namely:- 'St Radigunds' B & C Records (CAS 1042), 'Old Boot Wine' Pegasus Records (PEG 13), and 'Bells, Boots, & Shambles' Polydor (2310 246), while gigging extensively on the UK college circuit, as well as completing numerous successful tours of Europe. During the same period, Gaskin met guitarist Steve Hillage (also a student at Kent University) and via Hillage, the members of Canterbury band Caravan, and Hillage's old friend and musical colleague Dave Stewart. Gaskin guested both live and on record with Stewart's band 'Hatfield & The North', and was a member of the 'Ottawa Music Company', brainchild of Dave Stewart and 'Henry Cow' drummer Chris Cutler. The intricate, largely instrumental music of bands such as Egg, Hatfield & The North and Henry Cow, and by contrast, the more spontaneous, lyrically driven approach of Spirogyra, were both powerful formative musical influences on Gaskin during the six years she lived in Canterbury.

When Spirogyra split up, Gaskin left England to travel in Asia for nearly three years, following her interest in Eastern philosophy and culture while earning money by teaching English. She continued to sing – in Japan, professionally – and while living in Java and Bali became very interested in gamelan music. She also lived in India for a total of 18 months.

On returning to England, Gaskin was invited by drummer Germaine Dolan to play keyboards and sing in the all female band Red Roll On. Based in Canterbury, the band played in clubs and art colleges in the London area. But Gaskin also renewed her musical association with Dave Stewart by contributing vocals to his compositions on Bill Bruford's "Gradually Going Tornado" album. In 1981 Gaskin and Stewart joined forces and recorded the hit single "It's My Party". The collaboration has continued to this day with a series of singles and albums on their own Broken Records label and Rykodisc Records. After 40 years together in 2021 Gaskin and Stewart were finally married.

Discography

With Spirogyra
 St. Radigunds (B&C, 1971)
 Old Boot Wine (B&C, 1972)
 Bells, Boots and Shambles (B&C, 1973)
 Burn The Bridges (Repertoire, 2000)

With Hatfield and the North
 Hatfield and the North (Virgin, 1973)
 The Rotters' Club (Virgin, 1975)
 Afters (Virgin, 1980)
 Hatwise Choice (2005)
 Hattitude (2006)

With Egg
 The Civil Surface (Virgin, 1974)
 The Metronomical Society (2007)

With National Health
 National Health (1977)
 Of Queues and Cures (1978)
 D.S. al coda (1982)
 National Health Complete (1990)
 Missing Pieces (1994)
 Playtime (2001)

With Bill Bruford
 Gradually Going Tornado (Polydor, 1980)

With Peter Blegvad
 The Naked Shakespeare (Virgin, 1983)

With Nigel Planer
 Neil's Heavy Concept Album (1984)

With Phil Miller
 Cutting Both Ways (Cuneiform, 1989)

With Jane Wiedlin
 Tangled (1990)

With Rick Biddulph
 Second Nature (Voiceprint, 1994)

With Dirk Mont Campbell
 Music from a Round Tower (Resurgence, 1996)
 Music from a Walled Garden (MFA, 2009)

Singles / EPs with Dave Stewart
 "It's My Party" (Broken, 1981)
 "Johnny Rocco" (Broken, 1982)
 "Siamese Cat Song" (Broken, 1983)
 "Busy Doing Nothing" (Broken, 1983)
 "Leipzig" (Broken, 1983)
 "I'm in a Different World" (Broken, 1984)
 "The Locomotion" (Broken, 1986)
 "Walking the Dog" (Line (Germany) 1992)
 Hour Moon (EP) (Broken, 2009)

Albums with Dave Stewart
 Up From The Dark (compilation), Rykodisc (USA) RCD 10011 (1986)
 Broken Records – The Singles, MIDI Records (Japan) (1987)
 As Far As Dreams Can Go, MIDI Records (Japan) (1988)
 The Big Idea, Rykodisc RCD 20172 / MIDI Records (1989)
 Spin, Rykodisc RCD 20213 / MIDI Records (1991)
 Selected Tracks (compilation), Musidisc (France) / Disky (Holland) (1993)
 Green and Blue, Broken Records BRCDLP-05 (March 2009)
 The TLG Collection, Broken Records BRCDLP-06 (October 2009)
 Broken Records – The Singles (Special Edition), Broken Records BRCDLP-01 (November 2010)
 As Far As Dreams Can Go (Special Edition), Broken Records BRCDLP-02 (November 2010)
 The Big Idea (Special Edition), Broken Records BRCDLP-03 (December 2011)
 Spin (Special Edition), Broken Records BRCDLP-04 (December 2011)
 Star Clocks, Broken Records BRCDLP-07 (September 2018)

References

External links
Dave Stewart & Barbara Gaskin Website
Biography

Canterbury scene
English women singers
People from Hatfield, Hertfordshire
Living people
1950 births
Musicians from Hertfordshire
Hatfield and the North members
Alumni of the University of Kent